The Canadian is an extant 1926 American silent drama film produced by Famous Players-Lasky and distributed by Paramount Pictures. It is based on a 1913 Broadway play, The Land of Promise, by W. Somerset Maugham. The film was directed by William Beaudine and starred Thomas Meighan. Meighan had costarred with Billie Burke in a 1917 silent film based on the same story, The Land of Promise. In both films he plays the same part. This film is preserved in the Library of Congress.

Plot
A couple undergo hardship homesteading in Alberta, where they are plagued by bad weather and financial woes.

Cast
Thomas Meighan as Frank Taylor
Mona Palma as Nora
Wyndham Standing as Ed Marsh
Dale Fuller as Gertie
Charles Winninger as Pop Tyson
Billy Butts as Buck Golder

References

External links

Screen shot of opening title from the dvd
Lobby poster
Period newspaper advertisement

1926 films
American silent feature films
Films directed by William Beaudine
American films based on plays
Paramount Pictures films
Famous Players-Lasky films
1926 romantic drama films
American romantic drama films
American black-and-white films
1920s American films
Silent romantic drama films
Silent American drama films